An Evening of Yes Music Plus is a double live album from the English progressive rock band Anderson Bruford Wakeman Howe, released in October 1993 on Fragile Records.

Overview
An Evening of Yes Music Plus is a recording of the group's concert at the Shoreline Amphitheatre in Mountain View, California, US on 9 September 1989 that was originally broadcast on the King Biscuit Flower Hour radio program and as a pay-per-view special in the United States.

Production
The cover features a painting by Roger Dean titled "Floating Islands".

Track listing

1993 CD edition

2006 CD edition

DVD

Personnel
Anderson Bruford Wakeman Howe
Jon Anderson – lead vocals
Bill Bruford – drums, percussion
Rick Wakeman – keyboards
Steve Howe – guitar, backing vocals

Additional musicians
Jeff Berlin – bass
Julian Colbeck – additional keyboards, backing vocals
Milton McDonald – rhythm guitar, backing vocals

References

1993 live albums
1993 video albums
Albums with cover art by Roger Dean (artist)
Anderson Bruford Wakeman Howe albums
Caroline Records live albums
Caroline Records video albums
Live video albums